Naheed Naeem Rana (born 13 October 1972) is a Pakistani politician who was a Member of the Provincial Assembly of the Punjab, from May 2013 to May 2018.

Early life 
She was born on 13 October 1972 in Gujranwala.

Political career

She was elected to the Provincial Assembly of the Punjab as a candidate of Pakistan Tehreek-e-Insaf on a reserved seat for women in 2013 Pakistani general election.

References

Living people
Punjab MPAs 2013–2018
1972 births
Pakistan Tehreek-e-Insaf politicians